Chloé Leurquin (born 9 August 1990) is a Belgian professional golfer from Waterloo, Belgium.

Leurquin won the Mineks Ladies Classic on the LET Access Series in 2013.

In 2014, she was the leader after two rounds at the Xiamen Open International.

Leurquin has played on the Ladies European Tour since 2014.

She is sponsored by Ricoh.

Professional wins

LET Access Series
2013 Mineks Ladies Classic

Team appearances
Amateur
European Girls' Team Championship (representing Belgium): 2007
European Ladies' Team Championship (representing Belgium): 2008, 2009, 2010, 2011
Espirito Santo Trophy (representing Belgium): 2010, 2012

Professional
European Championships (representing Belgium): 2018

References

External links

Belgian female golfers
Ladies European Tour golfers
Olympic golfers of Belgium
Golfers at the 2016 Summer Olympics
Sportspeople from Rio de Janeiro (city)
Sportspeople from Walloon Brabant
1990 births
Living people